The French destroyer Fougueux was one of 14 s built for the French Navy during the 1920s.

Design and description
The L'Adroit class was a slightly enlarged and improved version of the preceding Bourrasque class. They were powered by two geared steam turbines, each driving one propeller shaft, using steam provided by three du Temple boilers.

The main armament of the L'Adroit-class ships consisted of four Canon de 130 mm Modèle 1924 guns in single mounts, one superfiring pair each fore and aft of the superstructure. Their anti-aircraft armament consisted of a pair of Canon de 37 mm Modèle 1925 guns. The ships carried two above-water triple sets of  torpedo tubes. A pair of depth charge chutes were built into their stern; these housed a total of sixteen  depth charges. In addition two depth charge throwers were fitted for which six  depth charges were carried.

Construction and career
Fougueux was laid down on 21 September 1927, launched on 4 August 1928 and completed on 15 June 1930. She was sunk on 8 November 1942 off Casablanca, French Morocco, during the Naval Battle of Casablanca by gunfire from the United States Navy battleship . Twelve of her sailors were killed.

Notes

References

 
 

L'Adroit-class destroyers
World War II destroyers of France
1928 ships
Maritime incidents in November 1942